Jonk River is a tributary of Mahanadi River that flows for approximately 210 kilometers through the Nuapada District and Bargarh District in the state of Odisha; and the Mahasamund District and Raipur District in the state of Chhattisgarh in India. The river starts from the Sunabeda plateau and enters Maraguda valley where it is joined by a stream called Gaidhas-nala near Patora village. The river forms Beniadhas fall (80 feet) and Kharaldhas Fall (150 feet) before entering the valley. It joins Mahanadi at    Shivrinarayan.

References

External links 
 Jonk river joins Mahanadi river in wikimapia

Rivers of Chhattisgarh
Tributaries of the Mahanadi River
Rivers of India